Hurricane Douglas was a strong tropical cyclone that became the closest passing Pacific hurricane to the island of Oahu on record, surpassing the previous record held by Hurricane Dot in 1959. The eighth tropical cyclone, fourth named storm, first hurricane, and first major hurricane of the slightly below-average 2020 Pacific hurricane season, Douglas originated from a tropical wave which entered the basin in mid-July. Located in favorable conditions, the wave began to organize on July 19. It became a tropical depression on July 20 and a tropical storm the following day. After leveling off as a strong tropical storm due to dry air, Douglas began rapid intensification on July 23, becoming the season's first major hurricane the following day and peaking as a Category 4 hurricane. After moving into the Central Pacific basin, Douglas slowly weakened as it approached Hawaii. The storm later passed north of the main islands as a Category 1 hurricane, passing dangerously close to Oahu and Kauai, causing minimal damage, and resulting in no deaths or injuries. Douglas weakened to tropical storm status on July 28, as it moved away from Hawaii, before degenerating into a remnant low on July 29 and dissipating on the next day.

Meteorological history

Douglas originated from a tropical wave located over the central portion of the East Pacific basin on July 19. This tropical wave was located further east and in a slightly more conducive environment than another tropical wave to its east, later to become Tropical Depression Seven-E. With large convective bursts repetitively occurring near the circulation, the wave became more organized into the day and chances of development were gradually raised. This organization was followed by a scatterometer pass which indicated the system had a well-defined, closed low level circulation, indicating the system had very quickly developed. Thus, the first advisory was issued on the system as Tropical Depression Eight-E at 15:00 UTC on July 20. This quick evolution of the storm continued, and a small but defined central dense overcast became evident on satellite imagery. This, bundled with increasing satellite estimates, allowed the National Hurricane Center (NHC) to upgrade the depression to Tropical Storm Douglas at 03:00 UTC, July 21.

A small cyclone, Douglas continued to take advantage of its favorable environment and continuously intensified. Well-defined banding developed on the storm's western side, while thunderstorms near the center gathered into a comma head shape. At the time, Douglas' southwest movement was largely influenced by strong mid-level ridging to its north. However, Douglas' small size and this movement allowed a moderate intake of dry air to be entrained into the circulation. Intensification took a halt for much of July 22, as a result, and Douglas' thunderstorms began to slowly decay. After successfully mixing out mid-level dry air from the core of the system, Douglas swiftly recuperated. Convection re-developed, and a ragged eye became briefly evident on satellite imagery, indicating Douglas had strengthened to low-end Category 1 hurricane intensity. This marked the fourth-latest date on record that the first hurricane formed in a season, tying the record of 2004's Hurricane Celia. It soon became apparent Douglas was entering a phase of rapid intensification, as a ring of intense thunderstorms formed around a warming eye. Douglas jumped to Category 3 major hurricane status, as rapid intensification continued, and the storm became larger in size. Intensification slightly leveled off as the day went on, but the formerly-ragged eye became very warm and symmetrical, indicating the storm had entered a more stable state.
  
On July 24, visible imagery revealed Douglas' eye had become increasingly cloud-filled, while the storm's overall satellite appearance degraded. Douglas entered the Central Pacific Hurricane Center's area of responsibility by 21:00 UTC on July 24. As Douglas drifted over cooler sea surface temperatures, more weakening ensued as the system continued northwest. Douglas eventually fell below Category 3 major hurricane status late on July 24, and weakened to a Category 1 hurricane about 12 hours later. Douglas continued a slow movement towards the Hawaiian islands, while retaining its intensity, before weakening further as it passed north of Big Island. Nonetheless, the storm remained in rather healthy condition, despite being situated over cold sea surface temperatures and experiencing wind shear near Hawaii. Douglas passed north of Maui at 01:00 UTC on July 27, Oahu at 07:00 UTC, and Kauai at 22:00 UTC. After moving away from Kauai, Douglas briefly re-intensified as confirmed from reconnaissance. However, strengthening was very short-lived as wind shear quickly displaced deep convection from the storm's circulation. Douglas weakened into a tropical storm shortly afterward, and eventually became a remnant low by 12:00 UTC on July 29. Douglas' post-tropical low entered the Western Pacific basin later on July 30, before opening up into a trough at 06:00 UTC that day.

Preparations and impact

In preparation for the arrival of Douglas in Hawaii, Hurricane Watches were issued for Big Island and Maui on July 24. By July 25, hurricane warnings were issued for Oahu and Kauai, while tropical storm warnings were issued for the Big Island and Maui, as Douglas' track forecast became more definitive. Emergency sirens were blared across Oahu and Maui on July 26 as Douglas approached closer to the islands. United States President Donald Trump issued an emergency declaration for the entire state of Hawaii, in preparation of the hurricane. On Oahu, 13 emergency shelters were opened across the island for those in need. On July 25, the Hawai'i Volcanoes National Park closed due to the hurricane.

Despite Douglas' close pass to the Hawaiian Islands, much of the islands were spared from the worst of the hurricane as only the weak southern eyewall of Douglas brushed the islands. Overall damage was relatively minor; however, storm surge and rainfall caused moderate flooding in Kauai and Oahu. Winds never exceeded hurricane-force, although a  wind gust occurred on Maui. Rainfall totals also reached up to 6 inches in Maui and Oahu. On July 26, Maui Mayor Mike Victorino stated: "You can pretty much see clear skies. We're so very thankful. I'm thankful that it passed us with very little damage and very little incidents."

See also

 Weather of 2020
 Tropical cyclones in 2020
 List of Category 4 Pacific hurricanes
 Other tropical cyclones named Douglas
 List of Hawaii hurricanes
 Hurricane Gil (1983) – Category 1 hurricane took a similar path and passed just north of Hawaii as a tropical storm
 Hurricane Lane (2018) – Category 5 hurricane that became the second wettest tropical cyclone in the United States
 Hurricane Olivia (2018) – Category 4 hurricane that made landfall in Maui as a minimal tropical storm

References

External links

 The NHC's Advisory Archive on Hurricane Douglas

Tropical cyclones in 2020
Hurricanes in Hawaii
Category 4 Pacific hurricanes
2020 Pacific hurricane season